Lariophaugus is a genus of hymenopteran parasitoids in the family Pteromalidae. The genus was described by American entomologist and taxonomist James Chamberlain Crawford, with the type species Lariophagus texanus.

Species
Species include:
Lariophagus distinguendus Förster, 1841
Lariophagus dryorhizoxeni (Ashmead, 1886)
Lariophagus fimbriatus Boucek, 1965
Lariophagus kuwayamai Kamijo, 1981
Lariophagus obtusus Kamijo, 1981
Lariophagus rufipes Hedqvist, 1978
Lariophagus texanus Crawford, 1909

References

Pteromalidae